Salim al-Dabbagh (born 1941 in Mosul, Iraq) is an Iraqi painter and installation artist noted for abstract work that references Iraqi traditions. He was one of the founders of  the Innovationists Group; an artists' collective that helped to shape modern art in Iraq and was the Head of the Graphic Department at the Institute of Fine Arts in Baghdad from 1971 to 2000.

Life and career

Salim al-Dabbagh was born in Mosul, Iraq in 1941. As a child he observed locals engaged in traditional craft-work, which helped him to develop a love of local tradition and culture. He was fascinated by the women using goat hair to weave tents on the streets and in the squares. He would later use this as a source of inspiration for his artwork.

He obtained a degree in painting from the Baghdad Institute of Fine Arts in 1965. He was then awarded a scholarship by the Calouste Gulbenkian Foundation to undertake a two-year course in graphic arts in Lisbon (1967–68). He began painting in an abstract style as a student of Roman Artymowski, the Polish artist used circular geometric forms. However, al-Dabbagh, who wanted to reference the nomads' tents he had observed as a child, was enchanted by rectangular forms.

He was an active participant in the Iraqi arts community. In 1965, he was one of the founders of the art group known as Al-Mujadidin (The Innovationists) whose members included Salman Abbas, Amer al-Obaidi, Saleh al-Jumai'e, Faik Husein, Nida Kadhim and Talib Makki, The membership of this group comprised younger members of Iraq's arts scene, and especially those who wanted to experiment with different media and who often chose war and conflict as key themes for their artwork and was one of the more enduring of all Iraq's art groups. The group held its first exhibition in 1965 at the National Gallery of Modern Art where members all exhibited works.

Al-Dabbagh has worked as an art and graphic design professor and served as Head of the Graphic Design Department at Baghdad's Institute of Fine Arts (1971-2000) and has also worked as a consultant to Iraqi fashion houses. He lives and works in Baghdad.

Awards 

Al-Dabbagh has been the recipient of multiple awards including:

 1987 Bronze Medal, Cairo
 1986 Inter Graphic Award, Berlin, East Germany 
 1985 Miro Picasso Award, Arab Spanish League,  Baghdad and Madrid
 1980 Inter Graphic in Berlin in East Germany
 1978 The Golden Sail Award in Kuwait 
 1966 Honourable Mention at the Leipzig International Art Exhibition on Acrylic Art, Germany

Work

He has held several solo exhibitions in Baghdad, Lisbon, Kuwait and Beirut.  His work is conspicuously abstract, however, the sources of inspiration evident in his paintings are distinctly Iraqi. The Kaaba (cube) is purest  source  of  inspiration, but he also uses other geometric forms. The colours he favours are black and white; a reference to the black and white tents as used by Bedouin nomads.

See also
 Iraqi art
 List of Iraqi artists

References

External links
 Modern Art Iraq Archive - includes reproductions of artworks, many of which were looted from the Museum of Modern Art in 2003 and remain missing. These artworks are not accessible in any other public source.

Further reading
 Ali, W., Modern Islamic Art: Development and Continuity, University of Florida Press, 1997
 Shabout, N.M., Modern Arab Art: Formation of Arab Aesthetics, University of Florida Press, 2007
 Bloom J. and Blair, S., The Grove Encyclopedia of Islamic Art and Architecture, Oxford University Press, 2009 Vols 1-3
 Reynolds, D.F. (ed.), The Cambridge Companion to Modern Arab Culture, Cambridge University Press, 2015
 Faraj, M., Strokes Of Genius: Contemporary Art from Iraq, London, Saqi Books, 2001 
 Schroth, M-A. (ed.), Longing for Eternity: One Century of Modern and Contemporary Iraqi Art, Skira, 2014 
 Bahrani, Z. and Shabout, N.M., Modernism and Iraq, Miriam and Ira D. Wallach Art Gallery and Columbia University, 2009 
 "Iraq: Arts" Encyclopedia Britannica, Online:

20th-century Iraqi painters
Abstract painters
Artists from Baghdad
Iraqi contemporary artists
1941 births
Living people